, stylized as Ki*Me*Ra, is a two-volume manga series written and illustrated by Kazuma Kodaka and serialized in Super Jump. It was adapted into a single episode original video animation by Toho in 1996. Both the manga and OVA were licensed and released in English by ADV Films. It focuses on a man named Osamu, who falls in love with an androgynous vampire-like man named Kimera, being held by the Air Force and hunted by two other vampires. One vampire wishes to use Kimera for his/her hermaphroditic nature as the mother to revive their dying race, while another wishes to kill Kimera to save him/her from a fate Kimera did not desire.

Plot (OVA) 
The story begins when a mysterious space shuttle crash lands on Earth, which is then witnessed by a middle-aged man and his dog who decide to investigate the scene. After coming across the now wrecked-up space shuttle, they begin to hear strange noises coming from the woods; suddenly they see a pair of red tentacles coming from out of the bloom and a deformed humanoid in a large cloak who then kills the man's dog with its tentacles and sucking out its insides, traumatizing the man before he is about to be attacked himself-(though his fate is undetermined).

The scene then shifts to a car driving on the road at night in the rain. In the car, two cereal salesmen, Osamu-(a foreigner from Japan) and Jay-(Osamu's colleague and best friend), are driving along when they come upon an accident scene. They are ordered by Air Force to flee, but before they can they are attacked by vampiric creatures. Osamu is blown into a trailer where he finds a beautiful, green-haired androgynous-looking figure with striking heterochromia, Kimera, inside a cryogenic container. A silver bell he recently purchased and wears around his neck rings, waking the creature inside who kisses him through the glass. Two of the vampire-like creatures arrive, one of them a long ebony-haired male vampire attacking Osamu, and a disfigured one defending him. They disappear, and Osamu and Jay are taken to the Air Force base. They are released as Jay's father, Dr. Gibson, is on the research team there.

Dr. Gibson calmly tells Osamu and Jay to forget everything that happened, though Jay argues it would be impossible and demands an explanation. Gibson is called away and accidentally leaves his security card behind. Osamu and Jay decide to use it to search for Kimera, with Osamu sensing Kimera calling him in the right direction. Meanwhile, the ebony-haired male vampire from the previous night, Kianu, goes through the facility killing people in search of Kimera. He wears a bell bracelet that makes a similar chime to Osamu's bell necklace. One of the research team members, Dr. Fender, meets with the deformed vampire, Ginzu, to discuss the status of the "Mother" system, and Ginzu complains about the lifeless food Fender brings "them."

Osamu and Jay find and free Kimera from the container in a garden within the lab; in the process of being freed, Kimera passionately kisses Osamu on the lips. Not long after, Kianu attacks them again, explaining that Kimera has to die; otherwise he will bring about the downfall of the planet. Ginzu and his minions' huge snakes break through the glass to attack Kianu, as Gibson and his team arrive after finding their dead companions elsewhere. Kimera begins glowing and the room explodes. After the explosion, Kimera and Osamu are nowhere to be found. Jay learns from his father that Kimera is actually a vampiric alien with fully functional male and female reproductive organs, who arrived on Earth with two other vampires two weeks prior in a meteorite incident.

Kimera reappears in the city, wearing only Osamu's lab coat. Two men from the arcade find and attempt to rape Kimera at a hotel-(while mistaking him for a young woman), who ends up draining them of their blood and killing them. Osamu dreams of Kimera's past and learns that Kimera and Kianu were once in love. In the past, Kimera lived peacefully, refusing to drink blood and having no desire to become "a mother" after seeing what one was. Kimera arrives and tries to make love to Osamu, though he tries to tell her that he is not Kianu. Ginzu attacks capturing Kimera and has Fender install her in the Mother system in hopes of creating at least two or three children before Kimera is killed. He explains to Osamu that vampires on their planet are no longer able to reproduce and that their ancestors have been betrayed by humans repeatedly through the ages. He also reveals that his, Kianu's, and Kimera's biological mother was originally a kidnapped human woman. Now on their planet, the adults are dying and only Kimera is the remaining one who can reproduce. Neither Ginzu nor Kianu can make children with Kimera as they are not fully functional men.

Kianu arrives and attacks again. As he and Ginzu fight, Fender finishes connecting Kimera to the system and is subsequently killed by Ginzu; who tells him that his services are no longer needed. Wounded and unable to free Kimera himself after a destructive battle between him and Ginzu, Kianu transports Osamu to kill Kimera. As Osamu prepares to shoot his gun, the building collapses, killing Ginsu and Kianu. Jay finds Osamu's bell crushed in the debris and mourns his friend; however, Osamu has survived unharmed and is shown to be together with Kimera in the desert, driving towards an unknown location. Though he knows Kimera happily believes he is Kianu and that their child may destroy the world, Osamu wants to have hope for the future, and is happy being in love with Kimera.

Characters

Reception 
The general reception to the OVA adaption was largely unfavorable, due to lack of proper story and character development, and differences from the original manga. Viewers have expressed ill response to Kimera's hermaphrodite features, thinking her to be male rather than female. In the original version in Japan, Kimera actually  a man. This confusion may be the result of translation discrepancies due to gender neutral pronouns in the Japanese language, and the attempt to appeal to a larger market beyond the originally intended shounen-ai audience.

The art for the manga has been described as reminiscent of Yuu Watase.

References

External links 
 

1996 anime OVAs
1996 horror films
Direct-to-video horror films
Fictional mute characters
Japanese animated horror films
1990s Japanese-language films
Seinen manga
Shueisha manga
Toho animated films
Vampires in animated film
Vampires in anime and manga
1996 films